Dennis Thiessen (born April 20, 1961, in Crystal City, Manitoba) is a wheelchair curler who was part of the winning team in wheelchair curling for Canada at the 2014 Winter Paralympics. He played on the winning Canadian team at the 2013 World Wheelchair Curling Championship. His disability is that at seventeen he lost his leg. He is the only Manitoban on the team and lives in Sanford, Manitoba.

He was inducted into the Canadian Curling Hall of Fame in 2019.

Personal 

Thiessen was born in Crystal City, Manitoba on April 20, 1961, and now resides in Sanford, Manitoba. He is married and has 2 children. In 1978, when Thiessen was 17 years old, he had an accident in his family's farm and had lost his leg. He was suggested to give wheelchair curling a try in 2005. He said that he was really inspired by another Manitoban winter sportsperson Cindy Klassen and that she was "the ultimate professional and a great representative of Canada". He had also started the organization "Manitoba Farmers with Disabilities".

Career

Sochi 2014 

At the age of 52, Thiessen has competed in his first Paralympic Games, he made the tryout two years before in 2012. After seeing the team, he said that "It was just an unbelievable feeling," Canada won the spot at the top of the podium by beating Russia 8–3. "It was an emotional high" explained Thiessen who has just won his first Paralympic Medal.

References

External links
 
 

1961 births
Living people
Canadian male curlers
Canadian wheelchair curlers
Paralympic wheelchair curlers of Canada
Paralympic medalists in wheelchair curling
Paralympic gold medalists for Canada
Paralympic bronze medalists for Canada
Wheelchair curlers at the 2014 Winter Paralympics
Wheelchair curlers at the 2018 Winter Paralympics
Wheelchair curlers at the 2022 Winter Paralympics
Medalists at the 2014 Winter Paralympics
Medalists at the 2018 Winter Paralympics
Medalists at the 2022 Winter Paralympics
Curlers from Manitoba
World wheelchair curling champions
Canadian wheelchair curling champions